Julieta Toledo (born 24 May 1997) is a Mexican sabre fencer.

References

1997 births
Living people
Mexican female sabre fencers
Fencers from Mexico City
Fencers at the 2016 Summer Olympics
Olympic fencers of Mexico
Fencers at the 2014 Summer Youth Olympics
Pan American Games medalists in fencing
Pan American Games silver medalists for Mexico
Fencers at the 2015 Pan American Games
Medalists at the 2015 Pan American Games
21st-century Mexican women